The 2005 Shilo shooting was the murder of four Palestinian laborers in the West Bank on 17 August 2005.  Israeli driver Asher Weisgan killed the men in an effort to derail the Israeli disengagement from Gaza.

Shooting
A father of two children, Asher Weisgan (born in ) was a resident of Shvut Rachel and a driver for Palestinian laborers near the West Bank Israeli settlement of Shilo, Mateh Binyamin.  On 17 August 2005, sometime after 5:00P.M., Weisgan used a knife to steal a security guard's M16 rifle, and then killed four Palestinians before turning himself in to security.  Weisgan was well-acquainted with the men, having known and eaten with them for years.

The fatalities of the shooting were Mohammed Mansour (aged 48) and Bassam Tauase (aged 30), both from Nablus; Halil Salah (aged 42) from Qalqilya; and Osama Moussa Tawafsha (aged 33) from Sanjil, near Ramallah.  Another man, Ruhi Qassam, was only wounded by Weisgan.

Saying he had no regrets about his actions, Weisgan had wanted to spur an Arab reprisal, thereby engaging the Israel Defense Forces, and preventing the further removal of Israelis from their homes in the Gaza Strip and northern Samaria (as part of the Israeli disengagement from Gaza).

Trial
Weisgan was convicted of murder.

According to Israeli human rights groups, convictions were rare for Israelis who commit crimes in the West Bank. Imprisoned in Ayalon Prison, Weisgan committed suicide by hanging in his cell on 22 December 2006.

References

2005 murders in Israel
21st-century mass murder in Israel
August 2005 crimes
August 2005 events in Asia
history of Mateh Binyamin Regional Council
Israeli disengagement from Gaza
mass shootings in Israel
terrorist incidents in Israel in 2005
Shilo shooting, 2005

he:טרור יהודי בישראל#אשר ויזגן